Folder 5 (also spelled Folder5) (フォルダファイヴ Forudafaivu) were a five-girl Japanese pop idol group on the Avex Trax music label. The group's music was known for its Eurobeat style. The band's music was produced by Takashi Kimura.

Band History
Folder 5 was a spinoff group from another J-pop group Folder, also signed to Avex. Along with the five girls, Folder also had two male members, Daichi and Joe. Daichi and Joe left the band due to puberty. Folder then became Folder 5. In 2000 they released their first single, "SUPERGIRL". Their third single, "Believe", was used as the second opening theme for the popular anime One Piece. The song "Ready!" from their fourth single "Stay..." was used as the theme song in the short "Jango's Dance Carnival" that was shown with One Piece's second movie, "Clockwork Island Adventure". They also made frequent appearances on the show Yoru mo Hippare. Their song "Magical Eyes" was also used as the opening theme for the Xbox game Nezmix, also known in North America and Europe as Sneakers, though it was removed in all English releases. After the release of their 8th single, "MY MIRACLE," in May 2002, they have, as of 2005, released no more singles. It appears as though they have disbanded, although no official announcements were ever made.

On March 21, 2012, "BEST COLLECTION ALBUM" was released and included all of their singles and coupling songs. It also included all of their music videos.

Post-Breakup 
Akina began her career as a solo artist in 2002.  To date, she has released three singles. Hikari signed on with the talent agency Paretto to become a TV personality. Arisa began her solo career on the indies scene in 2006, which lasted until her retirement 2009 after getting married.

Members 
Akina Miyazato
Arisa Nakama
Hikari Mitsushima
Natsu Aka
Moe Ishihara

Discography

Singles 
 "Supergirl" [released May 10, 2000]
 "Amazing Love" [released August 23, 2000]
 "Believe" [released November 29, 2000]
 "Stay..." [released March 14, 2001]
 "Final Fun-Boy" [released June 13, 2001]
 "Go Ahead!!" [released November 14, 2001]
 "Magical Eyes" [released March 6, 2002]
 "My Miracle" [released May 29, 2002]

Albums 
 Hyper Groove 1 [released July 25, 2001]
 Five Girls [released July 17, 2002]
 Hyper Groove Party [released January 22, 2003]
 Folder+Folder5 Complete Box [released June 25, 2003]

DVDs 
 Hyper Groove Clips [released December 12, 2001]
 Hyper Groove Clips 2 [released March 19, 2003]
 Folder+Folder5 Complete Box [released June 25, 2003]

References

External links 
 Folder 5 official page

Japanese dance music groups
Japanese girl groups
Japanese pop music groups
Japanese idol groups
Avex Group artists
Musical groups from Okinawa Prefecture